2011 Shonan Bellmare season.

J2 League

References

External links
 J.League official site

Shonan Bellmare
Shonan Bellmare seasons